Bağarası is a village in the Samsat District of Adıyaman Province in Turkey. The village is populated by Kurds of the Bezikan tribe and had a population of 129 in 2021.

The hamlets of Ambarlı and Sivrice are attached to Bağarası.

References

Villages in Samsat District
Kurdish settlements in Adıyaman Province